The Lauritzen Award is a Danish film award which is handed every year to a female and a male Danish actor once a year by the Lauritzen Fonden.

The prize is currently 250,000 DDK to each recipient since 2010. The prize was established in 1965 as the Henkel-prisen (Henkel Award), which was given to a female actor from 1965 to 1995. From 1965 to 2000 the Lauritzen Award / the Henkel Award was 50,000 DDK, from 2001 to 2009 the prize was 150,000 DDK.

The recipients are chosen of a prize-commeettee, which currently consists of these members: Jens Ditlev Lauritzen, chair person, Lauritzen Fonden, Geir Sveaass, stage director, Piv Bernth, representing, DR-Culture, Poul Nesgaard, head of the Danish Film School (Den Danske Filmskole), Rikke Rottensten, editor and writer of theatrical reviews for Kristeligt Dagblad, Lars C. W. Wallenberg who writes theatrical reviews for Børsen, Kasper Wilton, head of the theater Folketeatret, Jan Lauritzen representing the Lauritzen family.

The Lauritzen Fonden currently hands five other film awards:
Visionsprisen - 100,000 DDK - is handed to an individual or organization or a group who had the courage to try something completely new and who had a strong artistical vision.
Hædersprisen - 100,000 DDK is given to an experienced actor late in his or her glorious career in film, TV-series or on stage
Backstage-prisen - 50,000 DDK is handed to a back-stage person in film, TV or TV-series
Wauw-prisen - 30,000 DDK is handed to an experienced actor who plays in a non-expected kind of role.
“Believe in You“-prisen - 20,000 DDK is handed to a young talented actor.

Recipients of the Lauritzen Award 
 2021 – Anette Støvelbæk and Mikkel Boe Følsgaard
 2020 – Postponed
 2019 – Preben Kristensen and Maria Rossing
 2018 – Inge Sofie Skovbo and Mads Mikkelsen
 2017 – Danica Curcic and Ole Thestrup
 2016 – Solbjørg Højfeldt and Jesper Christensen
 2015 – Karen-Lise Mynster and Peter Plaugborg
 2014 – Marianne Høgsbro and Thure Lindhardt
 2013 – Birthe Neumann and Søren Malling
 2012 – Sidse Babett Knudsen and Nikolaj Lie Kaas
 2011 – Lene Maria Christensen and Ulf Pilgaard
 2010 – Paprika Steen and Olaf Johannessen
 2009 – Jesper Langberg and Ditte Hansen
 2008 – Henning Jensen and Tina Gylling Mortensen
 2007 – Bodil Jørgensen and Dejan Čukić
 2006 – Meike Bahnsen and Janus Bakrawi
 2005 – Jannie Faurschou and Nicolas Bro
 2004 – Trine Dyrholm and Ole Lemmeke
 2003 – Anne-Vibeke Mogensen and Søren Sætter-Lassen
 2002 – Ann Eleonora Jørgensen and Lars Mikkelsen
 2001 – Sofie Gråbøl and Jens Jørn Spottag
 2000 – Birgitte Simonsen and Kim Veisgaard
 1999 – Ellen Hillingsø and Aksel Erhardsen
 1998 – Andrea Vagn Jensen and Frits Helmuth
 1997 – Karen Wegener and Morten Kirkskov
 1996 – Lisbeth Gajhede and Mikael Birkkjær
 1995 – Jens Albinus and Søren Pilmark
 1994 – Henning Moritzen
 1993 – Jørgen Reenberg

Recipients of the Henkel Award 
1995 Charlotte Bøving 
1994 Tammi Øst
1993 Annika Johannessen
1992 Kirsten Rolffes
1991 Benedikte Hansen
1990 Bodil Kjer
1990 Ditte Gråbøl
1989 Helle Hertz
1988 Kirsten Lehfeldt
1987 Lily Broberg
1986 Malene Schwartz
1985 Birthe Neumann
1984 Karen-Lise Mynster
1983 Lisbeth Dahl
1982 Berthe Quistgaard
1981 Stina Ekblad
1980 Ulla Henningsen
1979 Susse Wold
1978 Lise Ringheim
1977 Kirsten Olesen
1976 Ann-Mari Max Hansen
1976 Merete Volstedlund
1973 Birgitte Federspiel
1972 Astrid Villaume
1971 Ghita Nørby
1970 Bodil Udsen
1969 Birgitte Price
1968 Karin Nellemose
1967 Lone Hertz
1966 Lily Weiding
1965 Bodil Kjer

References 

Danish film awards